The centavo (Spanish and Portuguese 'one hundredth') is a fractional monetary unit that represents one hundredth of a basic monetary unit in many countries around the world. The term comes from Latin centum, ('one hundred'), with the added suffix -avo ('portion').

Circulating
Places that currently use the centavo include: 
Argentine peso
Bolivian boliviano
Brazilian real
Cape Verdean escudo
Colombian peso
Cuban peso
Dominican peso
East Timor centavo coins
Ecuadorian centavo coins
Guatemalan quetzal
Honduran lempira
Mexican peso
Mozambican metical
Nicaraguan córdoba
Philippine peso (In English usage; séntimo or céntimo is used in Tagalog and Spanish respectively.)

Obsolete
Former forms of the centavo that are no longer in use include: 

Brazilian cruzeiro (from 1942 to 1986 and from 1990 to 1993)
Brazilian cruzado (from 1986 to 1989)
Brazilian cruzado novo (from 1989 to 1990)
Costa Rican colón (Between 1917 and 1920 only. As céntimo for other periods.)
Ecuadorian sucre (New centavo coins continued to circulate after the sucre was replaced by U.S. dollar in 2000.)
Salvadoran colón
Guinea Bissau peso
Mozambican escudo
Portuguese escudo (before the euro was introduced)
Portuguese Guinean escudo
Portuguese Indian escudo
Puerto Rican peso
São Tomé and Príncipe escudo
Venezuelan venezolano
Venezuelan peso
Chilean Cent (from 1975 to 1983, as a subdivision of the Chilean peso)

See also

Cent (currency)
Coin